Basham is an unincorporated community in western Morgan County, Alabama, United States, located just south of the city limits of the Morgan County seat Decatur.

History
Originally known as Basham's Gap, the community was settled by James H. Basham circa 1818. A post office operated under the name Basham's Gap from 1847 to 1895 and under the name Basham from 1895 to 1907.

References

Unincorporated communities in Alabama
Unincorporated communities in Morgan County, Alabama
Populated places established in 1818